Frontenac National Park is a 156.5 km2 provincial park in southeastern Quebec, Canada, created in 1987 and governed by Société des établissements de plein air du Québec. The park is located along Lac Saint-François roughly halfway between Quebec City and Sherbrooke. The nearest city is Thetford Mines.

See also
National Parks of Canada
List of National Parks of Canada
List of Quebec national parks

References

External links
Official site

National parks of Quebec
Protected areas of Chaudière-Appalaches
Protected areas of Estrie
Protected areas established in 1987
1987 establishments in Quebec